McDonald Heights is a residential village in York County, Pennsylvania, United States. McDonald Heights is located in the northern portion of York Township and is one of the neighborhoods of York.

References

Populated places in York County, Pennsylvania